Paul De Backer (28 November 1894 – 9 January 1963) was a Belgian swimmer. He competed in the men's 1500 metre freestyle event at the 1920 Summer Olympics.

References

External links
 

Olympic swimmers of Belgium
Swimmers at the 1920 Summer Olympics
Belgian male freestyle swimmers